Andrew Gordon is an American television producer and writer, based in Los Angeles, California. He is known for creating and producing the teen sitcom True Jackson, VP. He has also written on other popular shows such as The Big Bang Theory and Modern Family.

Works
He has written and produced for 1986 series Dennis the Menace, Kids Incorporated, Get a Life, Mad About You, Dream On, NewsRadio, Just Shoot Me!, Complete Savages, The Loop, Hot Properties, Modern Family, and DAG. In 2008, Gordon created the Nickelodeon sitcom, True Jackson, VP.

He is cochair of the board of directors of the Los Angeles County Museum of Art−LACMA.

References

External links
 

Television producers from California
American television writers
Year of birth missing (living people)
Living people
American male television writers
Businesspeople from Los Angeles
Writers from Los Angeles
People associated with the Los Angeles County Museum of Art
Place of birth missing (living people)
Screenwriters from California